The Wings of the Dove is an opera in 2 acts and 6 scenes by the American composer Douglas Moore that uses an English-language libretto by Ethan Ayer based on the 1902 novel of the same name by Henry James. Commissioned by the New York City Opera, the work premiered on October 12, 1961, at City Center, in a production directed by Christopher West with sets by Donald Oenslager, costumes by Patton Campbell, and choreography by Robert Joffrey. Written in a Neo-Romantic style, the work is composed in the tradition of the verismo opera of Giacomo Puccini.

Roles

References

Operas
English-language operas
1961 operas
Operas by Douglas Moore
Operas based on novels